Lebanon competed at the 2006 Winter Olympics in Turin, Italy.

Alpine skiing 

Note: In the men's combined, run 1 is the downhill, and runs 2 and 3 are the slalom. In the women's combined, run 1 and 2 are the slalom, and run 3 the downhill.

Skeleton

References

 

Nations at the 2006 Winter Olympics
2006 Winter Olympics
Winter Olympics